Side-chain, side chain, or sidechain may refer to:

Side chain, a chemical group attached to the main chain or backbone of a molecule, such as a protein
Substituent, an atom or group of atoms substituted in place of a hydrogen atom on the parent chain of a hydrocarbon
Side-chaining, an effect in digital audio processing
Sidechain (ledger), a designation for a particular blockchain

See also
Backbone chain
Branching (polymer chemistry)
Pendant group